Season one of the 2012 edition of El Gran Show premiered on August 25, 2011.

From this season, celebrities would no longer dance with dreamers, but with professional dancers who at the same time would be their choreographers with whom they would compete to help a charity.

On November 17, 2012, actress & model Jhoany Vegas and Pedro Ibáñez  were declared the winners, actress & singer Denisse Dibós and Eduardo Pastrana finished second, while tennis player Macs Cayo and Diana Follegati were third.

Cast

Couples 
On August 22, the 14 celebrities that would participate in the season were announced, even though there were a total of 13 couples because Bettina Oneto and her daughter  formed a trio during the competition along with the professional dancer José Morello, although later Bettina would leave the competition for personal issues.

After the retirement of Bettina Oneto, the bullfighter Alfonso de Lima also left the competition in week 7, being replaced by the actor Nikko Ponce.

Host and judges 
Gisela Valcárcel and Aldo Díaz returned as hosts, while Óscar López Arias replaced Christian Rivero as co-host. Morella Petrozzi, Pachi Valle Riestra and the VIP Jury returned as judges, while former MDO singer Alexis Grullón replaced Carlos Alcántara. On September 15, former judge Carlos Cacho joined the panel as a guest judge, replacing Grullón.

Scoring charts

Red numbers indicate the sentenced for each week
Green numbers indicate the best steps for each week
 the couple was eliminated that week
 the couple was safe in the duel
 the couple was eliminated that week and safe with a lifeguard
 the winning couple
 the runner-up couple
 the third-place couple

Average score chart
This table only counts dances scored on a 40-point scale.

Highest and lowest scoring performances
The best and worst performances in each dance according to the judges' 40-point scale are as follows:

Couples' highest and lowest scoring dances
Scores are based upon a potential 40-point maximum.

Weekly scores 
Individual judges' scores in the charts below (given in parentheses) are listed in this order from left to right: Morella Petrozzi, Alexis Grullón, Pachi Valle Riestra, VIP Jury.

Week 1: First Dances 
The couples danced cumbia, latin pop, merengue, reggaeton or salsa. This week, none couples were sentenced.

Due to personal issues, Bettina Oneto could not be present in the live show while Andrés "Balán" Gonzales was replaced by the politician, Juan Sotomayor.
Running order

Week 2: Cumbia Night 
The couples danced cumbia.
Running order

Week 3: Disco Night 
The couples (except those sentenced) danced disco.
Running order

*The duel
Alfonso & Lisette: Safe
Fabio & Jacqueline: Eliminated (but safe with the lifeguard)

Week 4: Salsa Night 
Individual judges' scores in the chart below (given in parentheses) are listed in this order from left to right: Morella Petrozzi, Carlos Cacho, Pachi Valle Riestra, VIP Jury.

The couples (except those sentenced) danced salsa.
Running order

*The duel
Balán & Alexandra: Safe
Fabio & Jacqueline: Eliminated

Week 5: Reggaeton Night 
Individual judges' scores in the charts below (given in parentheses) are listed in this order from left to right: Morella Petrozzi, Alexis Grullón, Pachi Valle Riestra, Jurado VIP.

The couples (except those sentenced) danced reggaeton and a danceathon of cumbia.

Due to personal issues, Bettina Oneto left the competition, leaving Shantall & José as a couple from next week.
Running order

*The duel
Balán & Alexandra: Eliminated (but safe with the lifeguard)
Alfonso & Lisette: Safe

Week 6: Latin Pop Night 
The couples (except those sentenced) danced latin pop and a danceathon of festejo.
Running order

*The duel
Valia & Angelo: Safe
Andy V & Stephany: Eliminated (but safe with the lifeguard)

Week 7: World Dances Night 
The couples performed the world dances and a team dance of axé.

Due to personal issues, Alfonso de Lima withdrew the competition, this being his last dance. From next week, the actor Nikko Ponce replaced him.
Running order

*The duel
Balán & Alexandra: Eliminated
Alfonso & Lisette: Safe

Week 8: Celebrity's Pick Night 
The couples (except those sentenced) performed a dance chosen by celebrities and a team dance of jazz.
Running order

*The duel
Korina & Emanuel: Eliminated
Areliz & Rodrigo: Safe

Week 9: Eras Night 
The couples (except those sentenced) performed one unlearned dance representing different historical eras. In the little train, the participants faced dancing strip dance.
Running order

*The duel
Shantall & José: Eliminated
Valia & Angelo: Eliminated
Nikko & Lisette: Safe

Week 10: Tribute to Gisela 
The couples (except those sentenced) performed a dance to pay tribute to Gisela Valcárcel. In the little train, the participants faced dancing strip dance.
Running order

*The duel
Waldir & Alejandra: Eliminated
Jhoany & Pedro: Safe
Nikko & Lisette: Eliminated

Week 11: Quarterfinals 
The couples danced salsa, a ballroom dance (except those sentenced) and a danceathon of huayno.
Running order

*The duel
Daniela & Sergio: Eliminated
Areliz & Rodrigo: Safe

Week 12: Semifinals 
The couples danced adagio, a sung dance (except those sentenced) in which the celebrities sang in the middle of the performance, and a danceathon of pachanga. In the little train, the participants faced dancing strip dance. This week, none couples were sentenced.
Running order

*The duel
Jhoany & Pedro: Safe
Areliz & Rodrigo: Eliminated

Week 13: Finals 
On the first part, the couples danced adagio and freestyle.

On the second part, the final three couples danced foxtrot.
Running order (Part 1)

Running order (Part 2)

Dance chart
The celebrities and professional partners will dance one of these routines for each corresponding week:
 Week 1: Cumbia, latin pop, merengue, reggaeton or salsa (First Dances)
 Week 2: Cumbia (Cumbia Night)
 Week 3: Disco (Disco Night)
 Week 4: Salsa (Salsa Night)
 Week 5: Reggaeton & the danceathon (Reggaeton Night)
 Week 6: Latin pop & the danceathon (Latin Pop Night)
 Week 7: One unlearned dance & team dances (World Dances Night)
 Week 8: One unlearned dance & team dances (Celebrity's Pick Night)
 Week 9: One unlearned dance & the little train (Eras Night)
 Week 10: One unlearned dance & the little train (Tribute to Gisela)
 Week 11: Salsa, ballroom dances & the danceathon (Quarterfinals)
 Week 12: Adagio, sung dance, the danceathon & the little-train (Semifinals)
 Week 13: Freestyle, adagio & foxtrot (Finals)

 Highest scoring dance
 Lowest scoring dance
 Gained bonus points for winning this dance
 Gained no bonus points for losing this dance
In Italic indicate the dances performed in the duel

References

External links 

El Gran Show
2012 Peruvian television seasons
Reality television articles with incorrect naming style